Lobisquama is a genus of flies in the family Stratiomyidae.

Species
Lobisquama barbata James, 1982

References

Stratiomyidae
Brachycera genera
Diptera of North America
Monotypic Brachycera genera